Hyatt House or The Hyatt House may refer to:

Hyatt House, the name of a chain of extended stay hotels from Hyatt (formerly Hyatt Summerfield Suites and Hotel Sierra)
Hyatt House, the world's first fly-in (airport) hotel, in Los Angeles, California, conceptualized and built by Jack D. Crouch, basis for the Hyatt hotel chain.
Other Hyatt hotels, such as:
Andaz West Hollywood, also known as Continental Hyatt House
Hyatt Regency Atlanta, also known as Regency Hyatt House
Purple Hotel in Illinois, also known as the Hyatt House Hotel
Hyatt Regency San Francisco Airport, originally opened as Hyatt House Hotel, Burlingame
The Hyatt House Hotel, Hyattstown, Maryland. A historic property built in 1804 operated as a hotel, a general store and presently a private residence.

Or it may refer to:
in the United Kingdom
Hyatt House, Gloucester, England, (or "Hyett House"), probably built in the 16th century.
in the United States
Thomas Hyatt House, Ridgefield, Connecticut, listed on the National Register of Historic Places (NRHP) in Fairfield County
Norwood-Hyatt House, Gloucester, Massachusetts, NRHP-listed
Hyatt-Livingston House, Dobbs Ferry, New York, NRHP-listed in Westchester County
Caleb Hyatt House, Scarsdale, New York, NRHP-listed in Westchester County
Abel Hyatt House, Bryson City, North Carolina, NRHP-listed in Swain County

Hyatt Hotels and Resorts